Lists of endangered languages are mainly based on the definitions used by UNESCO. In order to be listed, a language must be classified as "endangered" in a cited academic source. Researchers have concluded that in less than one hundred years, almost half of the languages known today will be lost forever.
The lists are organized by region.

Africa
 List of endangered languages in Africa

Asia
 List of endangered languages in Asia
 List of endangered languages in Bangladesh
 List of endangered languages in China
 List of endangered languages in India
 List of endangered languages in Indonesia
 List of endangered languages in Nepal

Europe
 List of endangered languages in Europe
 List of endangered languages in Russia

North America
 List of endangered languages in North America
 List of endangered languages in Canada
 List of endangered languages in Mexico
 List of endangered languages in the United States

Central and South America
 List of endangered languages in Central America
 List of endangered languages in South America
 List of endangered languages in Brazil
 List of endangered languages in Colombia

Oceania
 List of Australian Aboriginal languages
 List of endangered languages in Papua New Guinea
 List of endangered languages of the Pacific

Discussion
SIL Ethnologue (2005) lists 473 out of 6,909 living languages inventorized (6.8%) as "nearly extinct", indicating cases where "only a few elderly speakers are still living"; this figure dropped to 6.1% as of 2013.

When judging whether or not a language is endangered, the number of speakers is less important than their age distribution. There are languages in Indonesia reported with as many as two million native speakers alive now, but all of advancing age, with little or no transmission to the young. On the other hand, while there are only 30,000 Ladin speakers left, almost all children still learn it as their mother tongue; thus Ladin is not currently endangered. Similarly, the Hawaiian language has only about 1,000 speakers, but it has stabilized at this number, and there is now school instruction in the language, from preschool through the 12th grade; thus the language is classified as merely vulnerable.

While there are somewhere around six or seven thousand languages on Earth today, about half of them have fewer than about 3,000 speakers. Experts predict that even in a conservative scenario, about half of today's languages will become extinct within the next 50 to 100 years.

See also 
 Language family
 Language policy
 Linguistic rights
 Lists of extinct languages
 List of languages by time of extinction
 List of revived languages
 Minority language

References

External links 
 
 EndangeredLanguages.com